"The People Want to Dance" is a single from former Frankie Goes to Hollywood singer Holly Johnson, taken as the third and final single from his 1991 album Dreams That Money Can't Buy. The track would be Johnson's last release until 1994.

The song was written by Holly Johnson.

Background
Released as the third and final single from the Dreams That Money Can't Buy album, the single failed to make any national charts. The single received little airplay on radios and sold poorly. Around the time of the album's release, Johnson's relations with MCA cooled over dissatisfaction with promotional budgets for his second solo album. By the time this single was released, Johnson was no longer attached to the record company and was released without any involvement from Johnson.

In a 1991 interview with Melody Maker, Johnson said of the song's message, 

In 2010, Johnson said of the song's release as a single and the lack of a supporting music video, "'The People Want To Dance' didn't have a video mainly because I was no longer signed to MCA when the album and the single were released in 1991. They allocated no marketing budget to the album after the singles 'Where Has Love Gone' and 'Across the Universe' were released."

Release
The single was released on 7" vinyl, 12" vinyl and CD in 1991 across the UK and Germany only. The single was released entirely through MCA Records.

For the single release, the album version of the song was not used. Instead the remix "The People Want To Dance (Rave Hard Mix)" was used as the a-side, with the title referencing the 1986 Frankie Goes to Hollywood single Rage Hard. The remix version was created by Ben Chapman and used rapping from D. Marcus C. whilst Beverly Skeete, Claudia Fontaine and Derek Green provided backing vocals.

The 7" vinyl of the single featured "The People Want To Dance (Rave Hard Mix)" as the a-side along with the b-side, another remix of the song, titled "The People Want To Dance (Apollo 440 Mix)", which was remixed by Electronica/techno band Apollo 440.

The 12" vinyl replaced the a-side with an extended version of the remix, titled "The People Want To Dance (Raving Harder! Mix)", whilst the two b-sides were "The People Want To Dance (Apollo 440 Mix)" and "Love Train (Americanos Big Beat Version)", a Frankie Knuckles remix of Johnson's 1989 hit single. The remix had previously been released on the 1989 remix album Hollelujah as well as the American only 12" remix single "Love Train (Previously Unreleased Mixes)".

The CD single version used "The People Want To Dance (Rave Hard! Mix)" as the main track, whilst both "Love Train (Americanos Big Beat Version)" and "The People Want To Dance (Raving Harder! Mix)" were used as the other two tracks.

In the UK only, a promotional 12" vinyl was released, featuring the remix "The People Want to Dance (The Ben Chapman Mix)" along with the b-side "The People Want to Dance (Apollo 440 Mix)".

Promotion
The single had no music video or TV performances as a form of promotion as Johnson had no involvement of the release. The single remains Johnson's only post-1989 single not to have a music video, except the promotional 1998 single "Hallelujah!".

Track listing
7" Single
"The People Want to Dance (Rave Hard Mix)" - 3:24
"The People Want to Dance (Apollo 440 Mix)" - 6:28

12" Single
"The People Want to Dance (Raving Harder! Mix)" - 5:14
"The People Want to Dance (Apollo 440 Mix)" - 6:29
"Love Train (Americanos Big Beat Version)" - 6:39

12" Single (UK Promo)
"The People Want to Dance (The Ben Chapman Mix)"
"The People Want to Dance (Apollo 440 Mix)" - 6:29

CD Single
"The People Want to Dance (Rave Hard Mix)" - 3:26
"Love Train (Americanos Big Beat Version)" - 6:39
"The People Want to Dance (Raving Harder! Mix)" - 5:14

Critical reception
In a review of Dreams That Money Can't Buy, Ian Gittins of Melody Maker noted that Johnson "dig[s] up the old 'Two Tribes' bassline" for the song. He added that the song sees Johnson "appoint[ing] himself spokesman for the rave generation, only to embarrass himself with shockingly naff sloganeering". Simon Williams of NME stated, "'The People Want to Dance' does manage to stagger with a remarkably moralistic manifesto which demands, 'Why do we get up in the morning? What makes us go out late at night?' Hmmm. You've got me stumped there, mate." In a retrospective review of the album, Jon O'Brien of AllMusic described it as a "weak attempt at gospel-tinged disco-pop".

Chart performance
The track failed to enter the UK Singles Chart or the German Singles Chart.

Remixes and B-sides
"The People Want to Dance (Apollo 440 Mix)"
"The People Want to Dance (Rave Hard! Mix)"
"The People Want to Dance (Raving Harder! Mix)"
"Love Train (Americanos Big Beat Version)"
"The People Want to Dance (The Ben Chapman Mix)"

Personnel

The People Want to Dance (Rave Hard! Mix)/(Raving Harder! Mix)
 Ben Chapman - Remix
 Producer – Andy Richards
 Executive Producer – Holly Johnson
 Additional Production – Ben Chapman, Mike 'Spike' Drake
 Programmer – Andy Richards, Ben Chapman, Gary Maughn, Holly Johnson
 Rap – D Marcus C
 Backing Vocals – Beverly Skeete, Claudia Fontaine, Derek Green
 Vocals - Holly Johnson 
 Writer – Holly Johnson

The People Want to Dance (Apollo 440 Mix)
 Remix – Apollo 440
 Mixer – Howard Grey

Love Train (Americanos Big Beat Version)
 Vocals - Holly Johnson
 Remix – Frankie Knuckles
 Additional Remixer – Peter "Ski" Schwartz, Satoshi Tomiie 
 Producer – Steve Lovell
 Additional Production – Stephen Hague

Other
 Artwork Design – Instinct

References

1991 singles
Songs written by Holly Johnson
MCA Records singles
Holly Johnson songs
1991 songs